Cize is the name of several communes in France:

 Cize, Ain
 Cize, Jura